The 2019 Hardee's Pro Classic was a professional tennis tournament played on outdoor clay courts. It was the nineteenth edition of the tournament which was part of the 2019 ITF Women's World Tennis Tour. It took place in Dothan, Alabama, United States between 15 and 21 April 2019.

Singles main-draw entrants

Seeds

 1 Rankings are as of 8 April 2019.

Other entrants
The following players received wildcards into the singles main draw:
  Usue Maitane Arconada
  Sophie Chang
  Louisa Chirico
  Alexa Guarachi

The following player received entry using a protected ranking:
  Lucie Hradecká

The following players received entry from the qualifying draw:
  Hanna Chang
  Olga Govortsova
  Katarzyna Kawa
  Kristína Kučová
  Abbie Myers
  Gabriela Talabă

Champions

Singles

 Kristína Kučová def.  Lauren Davis, 3–6, 7–6(11–9), 6–2

Doubles

 Usue Maitane Arconada /  Caroline Dolehide def.  Destanee Aiava /  Astra Sharma, 7–6(7–5), 6–4

References

External links
 2019 Hardee's Pro Classic at ITFtennis.com
 Official website

2019 ITF Women's World Tennis Tour
2019 in American tennis
Hardee's Pro Classic